Sir Anthony Joseph Mamo,  (9 January 1909 – 1 May 2008) was the first president of Malta and previously served as the last Governor-General of the State of Malta before the country became a republic. He was also the first Maltese citizen to be appointed Governor-General, and before independence, briefly served as acting Governor.

Biography 

Mamo was born in the town of Birkirkara, the son of Joseph Mamo and Carla Brincat. He was educated at the University of Malta where he earned a bachelor's degree in 1931 and his law degree in 1934.

Sir Anthony had been in private practice as an advocate for just over a year when he made the Public Service his career. In October 1936, he was appointed member of the Commission which, under the chairmanship of Judge Harding, was entrusted with the task of preparing a Revised Edition of all the Laws of Malta. This task took six years to complete.  He was in private practice a year before joining the civil service. He served as Crown Counsel from 1942 and later became attorney general.

In the meantime the Second World War broke out and, although the Commission's work was carried on. Sir Anthony as like so many others, gave his services for refugee work and the welfare of those hit by war.

Mamo was never involved directly in politics. He was appointed as Chief Justice of Malta in 1957 where he served until 1971 when he was appointed as Governor-General, the first Maltese to hold that office, serving until 13 December 1974, when Malta was proclaimed a republic. He served as president from that date until he was succeeded by Anton Buttigieg on 27 December 1976. He was given knight-hood in 1959.

Mamo was married to Lady Margaret (née Agius) from 1939 until her death in 2002. They had three children; Josephine (married to Victor E. Tortell), Monica (married to George Pisani) and John (married to Tessa née' Scicluna).

Mamo died on 1 May 2008 at the age of 99, at Casa Arkati in Mosta. An oncology center in Mater Dei Hospital was christened under his name as the Sir Anthony Mamo Oncology Centre

Honours

  : Companion of Honour of the National Order of Merit (06.04.90) by right as a former President of Malta
 Commonwealth of Nations :
 Officer of the Order of the British Empire (1955), 
 Knight Bachelor (1957)

References

1909 births
2008 deaths
Presidents of Malta
Knights Bachelor
Governors-General of Malta
University of Malta alumni
People from Birkirkara
Chief justices of Malta
20th-century Maltese judges

Companions of Honour of the National Order of Merit (Malta)
Officers of the Order of the British Empire
Maltese Queen's Counsel
20th-century King's Counsel
Governors and Governors-General of Malta
Maltese knights
Crown Colony of Malta judges
20th-century Maltese politicians